Events from the year 1818 in the United States.

Incumbents

Federal Government 
 President: James Monroe (DR-Virginia)
 Vice President: Daniel D. Tompkins (DR-New York)
 Chief Justice: John Marshall (Virginia)
 Speaker of the House of Representatives: Henry Clay (DR-Kentucky)
 Congress: 15th

Events

 January 18; Prince White [Son of Welch King White] arrives in the United States to open first fast food restaurant 
 March 15 – First Seminole War: Andrew Jackson leads an army into Spanish Florida.
 April – First Seminole War: Arbuthnot and Ambrister incident – Alexander George Arbuthnot and Robert Ambrister are captured by Andrew Jackson's forces and later executed for aiding the Spanish and the Seminoles.
 April 4 – The U.S. Congress adopts the flag of the United States as having 13 red and white stripes and one star for each state (20 stars) with additional stars to be added whenever a new state is added to the Union.
 April 7 – Brooks Brothers, the oldest men's clothier in the United States, opens its first store on the northeast corner of Catherine and Cherry Streets in New York City, where the South Street Seaport later stands.
 April 14 – United States Coast Survey operations suspended until August 9, 1832.
 May 23 – First Seminole War: Andrew Jackson's army enters Pensacola, Florida unopposed as the Spanish forces retreat to Fort Barrancas.
 May 28 – First Seminole War: Fort Barrancas surrenders to Andrew Jackson.
 July 11 – The Bank of the United States reverses its policy of expanding credit and sends notices to its borrowers nationwide demanding immediate repayment of balances due; the defaults during the next six months will trigger the Panic of 1819.
 July 15 – U.S. President James Monroe convenes a cabinet meeting to discuss whether General Andrew Jackson's unauthorized invasion and conquest of Spanish Florida should be disavowed by the White House. Secretary of State John Quincy Adams persuades the President that the action is justifiable as stopping terror caused by the Seminole tribes.
 July 16 – The Daniel Webster Debate Society of Phillips Exeter Academy is founded as The Golden Branch Literary Society, making it the oldest surviving secondary school literary society in the U.S.
 July 31 – The first newspaper in Cleveland, Ohio is issued by publisher Andrew Logan. Using the original name of the small settlement (population 172), Logan names the weekly paper The Cleaveland Gazette & Commercial Register. 
 August 1 – The Topographical Bureau of the United States Department of War is founded.
 October 6 – Shadrach Bond is inaugurated as the first governor of Illinois.
 October 18 – Andrew Jackson and Isaac Shelby negotiate the Treaty of Tuscaloosa for the purchase of land in modern-day western Tennessee and southwestern Kentucky from the Chickasaw Nation in what is later called the Jackson Purchase.
 October 20 – The Treaty of 1818 between the U.S. and the United Kingdom establishes the northern boundary of the U.S. as the 49th parallel from the Lake of the Woods to the Rocky Mountains, also creating the Northwest Angle.
 December 3 – Illinois is admitted as the 21st U.S. state (see History of Illinois).
 The Osage Nation cedes traditional lands by treaty.

Ongoing
 First Seminole War (1817–1818)
 Era of Good Feelings (1817–1825)

Births
 January 28 – George S. Boutwell, U.S. Senator from Massachusetts from 1851 to 1853 (died 1905)
 February 4 – Emperor Norton, San Francisco eccentric and visionary (died 1880)
 February 13 – Angelica Singleton Van Buren, Acting First Lady of the United States (died 1877)
 February 14 (self-adopted date) - Frederick Douglass, social reformer (died 1895)
 March 10 – George W. Randolph, lawyer, planter, Confederate general, 3rd Confederate States Secretary of War (died 1867)
 March 12 – John S. Hager, U.S. Senator from California from 1873 to 1875 (died 1890)
 March 23 – Don Carlos Buell, United States Army officer in Seminole War, Mexican–American War and American Civil War (died 1898)
 March 24 – William E. Le Roy, admiral (died 1888)
 March 28 – Wade Hampton III, Confederate soldier and South Carolinian politician (died 1902)
 April 1 – Omar D. Conger, U.S. Senator from Michigan from 1881 to 1887 (died 1898)
 May 1 – Zenas King, bridge builder (died 1892)
 May 27 – Amelia Bloomer, dress reformer, women's rights activist (died 1894)
 May 28 – P. G. T. Beauregard, Southern military officer, politician, inventor, writer, civil servant and first prominent general of the Confederate States Army during the American Civil War (died 1893)
 July 1 – Josiah Gorgas, Northern-born Confederate general (died 1883)
 July 10 – John Stuart Williams, U.S. Senator from Kentucky from 1879 to 1885 (died 1898)
 July 18 – Celadon Leeds Daboll, merchant and inventor (died 1866)
 July 22 – J. Gregory Smith, Vermont governor (died 1891)
 August 1 – Maria Mitchell, astronomer (died 1889)
 August 3 – Mary Bell Smith, educator, social reformer, and writer (died 1884)
 August 13 – Lucy Stone, social reformer (died 1893)
 September 12 – Richard Jordan Gatling, inventor, gunsmith (died 1903) 
 September 17 – William Henry Barnum, U.S. Senator from Connecticut from 1876 to 1879 (died 1889)
 October 8 – John Henninger Reagan, U.S. Senator from Texas, Acting Confederate States Secretary of the Treasury, Confederate States Postmaster General (died 1905)
 October 15 – Irvin McDowell, Union Army officer known for their defeat in the First Battle of Bull Run (died 1885)
 October 18 – Edward Ord, engineer and United States Army officer who saw action in the Seminole War, the Indian Wars, and the American Civil War (died 1883)
 November 5 – Benjamin Butler, major general of the Union Army during the American Civil War, leader in impeachment of Andrew Johnson (died 1893)
 November 11 – James Renwick Jr., architect (died 1895)
 December 13 – Mary Todd Lincoln, First Lady of the United States (died 1882)
 December 27 – J. Lawrence Smith, chemist (died 1883)

Deaths
 February 13 – 
 George Rogers Clark, military leader (born 1752)
 Absalom Jones, African-American abolitionist and clergyman (born 1746)
 May 10 – Paul Revere, American silversmith, engraver, early industrialist, and a Patriot in the American Revolution (born 1735)
 August 31 – Arthur St. Clair, major general in the Continental Army, President of the Continental Congress (born 1737)
 October 5 – Nancy Lincoln, mother of Abraham Lincoln (born 1784)
 October 28 – Abigail Adams, First Lady of the United States, Second Lady of the United States (born 1744)
 November 6 – Caleb Gibbs, commander (born 1748)

See also
Timeline of United States history (1790–1819)

References

Further reading
 Richard V. Carpenter, J. W. Kitchell. The Illinois Constitutional Convention of 1818. Journal of the Illinois State Historical Society, Vol. 6, No. 3 (October, 1913), pp. 327–424
 The Diocese of Baltimore in 1818. Archbishop Maréchal's Account to Propaganda, October 16, 1818. The Catholic Historical Review, Vol. 1, No. 4 (January, 1916), pp. 439–453
 Charles H. Rammelkamp, Thos Lippincott. Thomas Lippincott, a Pioneer of 1818 and His Diary. Journal of the Illinois State Historical Society, Vol. 10, No. 2 (July, 1917), pp. 237–255
 Leona Rostenberg, Timothy Fuller. Diary of Timothy Fuller: In Congress, January 12 – March 15, 1818. The New England Quarterly, Vol. 12, No. 3 (September, 1939), pp. 521–529
 Charles Cotesworth Pinckney, J. H. Easterby. Charles Cotesworth Pinckney's Plantation Diary, April 6 – December 15, 1818. The South Carolina Historical and Genealogical Magazine, Vol. 41, No. 4 (October, 1940), pp. 135–150
 Leo M. Kaiser. Stephen F. Austin's Oration of July 4, 1818. The Southwestern Historical Quarterly, Vol. 64, No. 1 (July, 1960), pp. 71–79
 Alfred Owen Aldridge. The Character of a North American as Drawn in Chile, 1818. Hispania, Vol. 49, No. 3 (September, 1966), pp. 489–494
 John Faucheraud Grimké, Thomas Smith Grimké, Adrienne Koch. A Family Crisis: Letters from John Faucheraud Grimké and Thomas Smith Grimké to Henry Grimké, 1818. The South Carolina Historical Magazine, Vol. 69, No. 3 (July, 1968), pp. 171–192
 Stephen W. Stathis. Dr. Barton's Case and the Monroe Precedent of 1818. The William and Mary Quarterly, Third Series, Vol. 32, No. 3 (July, 1975), pp. 465–474
 Ernest F. Dibble. Captain Hugh Young and His 1818 Topographical Memoir to Andrew Jackson. The Florida Historical Quarterly, Vol. 55, No. 3 (January, 1977), pp. 321–335
 John P. Resch. Politics and Public Culture: The Revolutionary War Pension Act of 1818. Journal of the Early Republic, Vol. 8, No. 2 (Summer, 1988), pp. 139–158
 Sandra F. VanBurkleo. "The Paws of Banks": The Origins and Significance of Kentucky's Decision to Tax Federal Bankers, 1818 – 1820. Journal of the Early Republic, Vol. 9, No. 4 (Winter, 1989), pp. 457–487
 James A. Edstrom. "With . . . Candour and Good Faith": Nathaniel Pope and the Admission Enabling Act of 1818. Illinois Historical Journal, Vol. 88, No. 4 (Winter, 1995), pp. 241–262

External links
 

 
1810s in the United States
United States
United States
Years of the 19th century in the United States